Qaleh-ye Dezh Nargesi (also Romanized as Qal‘eh-ye Dezh Nargesī; also known as Qal‘eh-ye Dezh) is a village in Dehdasht-e Gharbi Rural District, in the Central District of Kohgiluyeh County, Kohgiluyeh and Boyer-Ahmad Province, Iran. At the 2006 census, its population was 59, in 11 families.

References 

Populated places in Kohgiluyeh County